Bongani Ndodana-Breen (born 1975, in Queenstown, Cape Province, Republic of South Africa), is a South African-born composer, musician, academic and cultural activist. He is a member of the Xhosa clan. He was educated at St. Andrew's College and Rhodes University in Grahamstown (where he graduated with a PhD in Music Composition) and also studied composition in Stellenbosch under Roelof Temmingh.
In 1998 Ndodana-Breen was the first Black classical composer to be awarded the prestigious Standard Bank Young Artist Award for Music, by the National Arts Festival and sponsored by Standard Bank of South Africa. He was one of Mail & Guardian 200 Young South Africans and was profiled on CNN African Voices for his work Harmonia Ubuntu commissioned for the centenary of Nelson Mandela and based on his writings and speeches. He is a fellow at the Radcliffe Institute at Harvard University for the 2019/2020 academic year.

Dr. Ndodana-Breen's music is a blend of African and classical styles. Some of his music reflects on various scenes from his native Xhosa culture (such as Hintsa's Dances, which is based on the life of Paramount Chief Hintsa ka Khawuta, Apologia at Umzimvubu and Sons of The Great Tree).

He has received commissions from across the globe from the Hong Kong Chinese Orchestra the Miller Theatre of New York, Vancouver Recital Society, Minnesota Orchestra, Madame Walker Theatre, Indianapolis Chamber Orchestra, Ensemble Noir/MusicaNoir, Southern African Music Rights Organisation (SAMRO), National Arts Council of South Africa, Haydn Festival Eisenstadt, Johannesburg International Mozart Festival, The Emancipation Festival of Trinidad & Tobago and Wigmore Hall, London (a quintet for pianist Maria João Pires).

He has written operas, orchestral and chamber works, including the opera Winnie The Opera based on anti-apartheid activist Winnie Mandela. South Africa's liberation struggle seems to be a major theme in his orchestral works such as his piano concerto Emhlabeni, the short opera Hani on the anti-apartheid activist Chris Hani and more recently the oratorio Credo, a musical testament to the Freedom Charter.

Dr. Ndodana-Breen is also an advocate for cultural diversity, supporting various African efforts including LGBT causes.

Notable works
Orange Clouds, music by Ndodana-Breen and libretto by filmmaker John Greyson
Winnie The Opera
Safika, piano quintet commissioned by Stellenbosch International Chamber Music Festival
Uhambo/The Pilgrimage, opera/oratorio based on the epic poem by Guy Butler
Zulu gazing at the Rising Sun commissioned by the Hong Kong Chinese Orchestra
African Kaddish for orchestra
Rituals for Forgotten Faces, chamber music cycle in 6 parts
Apologia at Umzimvubu, string quartet
Miniatures on Motherhood, string quartet
Flowers in Sand, piano solo
Visions, flute solo
C'est tres Noir, piano duet
Two Nguni Dances, piano trio commissioned by the Haydn Festspiele for the Haydn bi-centenary
Hymn and Lament for the Sudan from the chamber opera Threnody & Dances
Intlanzi yase Mzantsi, piano quintet based on Schubert's Trout Quintet 
 Hani, short opera, commissioned by Cape Town Opera and the University of Cape Town
 Mzilikazi: Emhlabeni, commissioned by the Johannesburg International Mozart Festival
 Credo, oratorio with libretto by Brent Meersman based on South Africa's Freedom Charter

References

External links
Bongani Ndodana-Breen official site
Singing Winnie in Toronto by Brent Meersman, Mail & Guardian
The New Yorker: Garth Fagan Dance

Schubertiade Teatro Auditorio San Lorenzo de El Scorial
Pan African Festival Trinidad & Tobago
Essay introducing Fig Trees a video opera by John Greyson and David Wall
"The Struggle Continues" Interview on Chris Hani Opera Sunday Times
 Credo, Vision that inspired a modern classic, Mail & Guardian

1975 births
20th-century classical composers
21st-century classical composers
Living people
Alumni of St. Andrew's College, Grahamstown
Rhodes University alumni
South African composers
South African male composers
South African musicians
Xhosa people
Male classical composers
20th-century male musicians
21st-century male musicians